Freddy Salem (born May 1941) is a British businessman whose interests are in logistics and supply chain management. With his wife Muriel, the Salems have formed a large private art collection which is on display by appointment at their home in Regent's Park, London.

Early life and education
Salem was born in May 1941 in Lebanon. He gained his BA in business administration from the American University of Beirut and his MBA from INSEAD in 1966. As of 2015, he has two surviving brothers, Isaac, who is older and Beno, who is younger. A fourth brother, Raymond, died in 2002. Their father ran a money-changing business in Beirut, which his sons joined, before they in turn moved into financing Nigerian textile traders.

Career
Salem's business interests are in logistics and supply chain management. His directorships include Parker Logistics Limited, Forextra Developments Limited, and Forextra (Grosvenor) Limited. He is company secretary of Frelene Limited.

Property

Freddy and Moussa Salem are the owners, via a company registered in the United Kingdom, of 14-25 Mount Street in London, a row of buildings that includes Scott's restaurant where James Bond author, Ian Fleming, used to dine, and shops such as Marc Jacobs and Ralph Lauren with flats above. As of March 2015, the buildings are for sale with a starting price of £110 million.

Art collecting
Salem and his Beirut-born wife Muriel (who moved to England in 1975) are art collectors and patrons of the Cranford Collection. Formed in 1999, the Salems' art collection by 2014 comprised over 700 works with many from the Young British Artists of the 1990s. The collection is on display at a private home in the Regent's Park area with viewing by appointment. The Salems have been advised by Andrew Renton until 2011 when Anne Pontegnie succeeded him.

References

External links 
The Cranford Collection
"Terraced house on market for £100m in London". The Telegraph, 14 April 2009.

INSEAD alumni
British businesspeople
British art collectors
1941 births
Living people